Nave is a surname. Notable people with the surname include:

 Bartolomeo della Nave (–1636), Venetian merchant and art collector
 Doyle Nave (1915–1990), American football player
 Eric Nave (1899–1993), Australian cryptographer and intelligence officer
 Felecia M. Nave, American chemical engineer and academic administrator
 Frederick S. Nave (1873–1912), American jurist
 Howie Nave, American stand-up comedian, radio personality, writer, and movie critic 
 Johnny Nave, American racing car driver
 Omri Nave (1988–), Israeli footballer
 Orville Nave (1841–1917), American Methodist theologian and U.S. Army chaplain 
 Royston Nave (1886–1931), American artist
 Steve Nave (–2015), American actor and casting director
James H. Nave, American architect